Roberto Benzi (born 1937) is a French conductor and former child actor.

Early life
Roberto Benzi was born on December 12, 1937, in Marseille, France.
His parents discovered his musicality when he was very young, and taught him solfège and piano. As a teenager he acted in two films. When he was about ten years old he received instruction from André Cluytens.

Career
In 1960, at age 22, he made his first recordings with the Lamoureux Orchestra of works by Liszt, Beethoven, Bizet, Rossini, Respighi, and many more, for the Philips label, all released in the famous Hi-Fi Stereo series. He also made recordings with the Hague Philharmonic Orchestra, the London Symphony Orchestra and the Bucharest Philharmonic Orchestra. At age 27 he conducted "La Boutique Fantasque" (Rossini) for the Louis de Funes film The Sucker (1965).
Benzi was the conductor of the Orchestre National Bordeaux Aquitaine from 1973 to 1987. He was the conductor of the Arnhem Philharmonic Orchestra in Arnhem, The Netherlands from the 1989/1990 season till 1998. He later conducted orchestras in Russia and Japan.

Personal life
Benzi resides in Paris. He was married to opera singer Jane Rhodes, who died in 2011.

Filmography

References

External links

Living people
1937 births
Musicians from Marseille
French male conductors (music)
20th-century French conductors (music)
French male child actors
Chevaliers of the Légion d'honneur
Chevaliers of the Ordre des Palmes Académiques
Knights of the Ordre national du Mérite
21st-century French conductors (music)
20th-century French male musicians
21st-century French male musicians
Male actors from Marseille